2001 Bangladesh post-election violence were a series of violent incidents following the 2001 Bangladeshi general election. The religious minority, the Hindus, were victims of targeted violence by supporters of Bangladesh Nationalist Party.

Background
In the 2001 Bangladeshi general election the ruling Bangladesh Awami League led by Sheikh Hasina was defeated by the opposition party, Bangladesh Nationalist Party led by Khaleda Zia. Violence broke out between Bangladesh Awami League supporters and supporters of Bangladesh Nationalist Party with the support of Bangladesh Police.

Incident
The violence mostly occurred in South West Bangladesh which had large Hindu communities. The attacks started after the election victory of Bangladesh National Party. The attacks were systematic with a motive to destroy the economic resources of the Hindu community, terrorize them into fleeing to India, and grabbing their properties. Hindus were targeted in Bagerhat District, Barisal District, Bhola District, Bogra District, Brahmanbaria District,  Chittagong District, Feni District, Gazipur District, Jhenaidah District, Jessore District, Khulna District, Kushtia District, Munshiganj District, Natore District, Narayanganj District, Narsingdi District, Pirojpur District, Sirajganj District, Satkhira District, and Tangail District.

In October 2001 in Lalmohan Upazila, Bhola District, Bangladesh Nationalist Party supporters attacked Hindus and Bangladesh Awami League supporters. They looted Hindu houses and houses of Muslims who provided shelter to Hindus. Women and children were raped by the attackers. The attackers looted everything from the houses and cut down trees on the victims properties.

Mohammad Badrul Ahsan wrote in 16 November 2001 about 200 Hindu women were gang raped by members of Bangladesh Nationalist Party in Char Fasson Upazila, Bhola District. The youngest was 8 year old and the oldest was 70 year old. In Tuniaghara, Manirampur Upazila, Jessore District six Hindu families were forced to leave the area and two women were raped.

Reactions and legacy
Newspaper analysis blamed the violence on inadequate law enforcement activities. They also blamed the unpreparedness of the local government and administration to tackle violence.

In 2009, Bangladesh High Court ordered the a judicial investigation into the post election violence. In 2011 the judicial commission submitted the findings of its investigation. The report found evidence of targeted violence against the Hindu community by 25 thousand people which included 25 Ministers and Member of Parliaments of the  Bangladesh Nationalist Party-Jamaat-e-Islami led alliance government. The reported was rejected by Bangladesh Nationalist Party and accused the investigation of being partisan.

The commission reported that the number of rapes committed exceeded 18 thousand. The report also notes incidents of violence, arson, looting, and torture against the minority Hindu community of Bangladesh. In 2011, a court in Sirajganj District sentenced 11 individuals to life time imprisonment for the Rape of Purnima Rani Shil in the 2001 post election violence.

References

Anti-Hindu violence in Bangladesh
1990 crimes in Bangladesh
2001 in Bangladesh
Islamism in Bangladesh
2001 crimes in Bangladesh